New Masses (1926–1948) was an American Marxist magazine closely associated with the Communist Party USA. It succeeded both The Masses (1912–1917) and The Liberator (1918-1924). New Masses was later merged into Masses & Mainstream (1948–1963).  With the coming of the Great Depression in 1929 America became more receptive to ideas from the political Left and New Masses became highly influential in intellectual circles. The magazine has been called “the principal organ of the American cultural left from 1926 onwards."

History

Early years 
New Masses was launched in New York City in 1926 as part of the Workers (Communist) Party of America's publishing stable, produced by a communist leadership but making use of the work of an array of independent writers and artists. The magazine was established to fill a void caused by the gradual transition of The Workers Monthly (successor to The Liberator) into a more theoretically-oriented publication. The name of the new magazine was a tip of the hat to The Masses (1911–1917), forerunner of both publications.

The editorial staff of New Masses included The Masses alumni Hugo Gellert, John F. Sloan, Max Eastman, Mike Gold, as well as Joseph Freeman, Granville Hicks (starting in 1934), Walt Carmon, and James Rorty. Many contributors are now considered distinguished, even canonical authors/writers, artists, and musical composers: William Carlos Williams, Theodore Dreiser, John Dos Passos, Upton Sinclair, Richard Wright, Ralph Ellison, Dorothy Parker, Dorothy Day, John Breecher, Langston Hughes, Eugene O'Neill, Rex Stout and Ernest Hemingway. More importantly, it also circulated works by avowedly leftist, even “proletarian” (working-class) artists: Kenneth Fearing, H.H. Lewis, Jack Conroy, Grace Lumpkin, Jan Matulka, Ruth McKenney, Maxwell Bodenheim, Meridel LeSueur, Josephine Herbst, Jacob Burck, Tillie Olsen, Stanley Burnshaw, Louis Zukofsky, George Oppen, Crockett Johnson, Wanda Gág, Albert Halper, Hyman Warsager, and Aaron Copland.

The vast production of left-wing popular art of the 1930s and 1940s was an attempt to create a radical culture in conflict with mass culture. Infused with an oppositional mentality, this cultural front was a rich period in American history and is what Michael Denning calls a “Second American Renaissance” because it permanently transformed American modernism and mass culture. One of the foremost periodicals of this renaissance was New Masses.

The magazine adopted a loosely leftist position at its onset, and Frederick J. Hoffman describes “among the fifty-six writers and artists connected in some way with the early issues of the New Masses, [Joseph] Freeman reports, only two were members of the Communist Party, and less than a dozen were fellow travelers”. There was, however, eventual transformation: the editorial shift from a magazine of the radical left, with its numerous competing points of view, gave way to a bastion of Marxist conformity. When Gold and Freeman gained full control by 1928 the “Stalinist/Trotskyist” division began in earnest. Gold’s January 1929 column “Go Left, Young Writers” began the “proletarian literature” movement, one spurred by the emergence of writers with true working-class credentials. Barbara Foley points out, though, that Gold and his peers did not eschew various literary forms in favor of strict realism; they advocated stylistic experimentation but championed and preferred genuine proletarian authorship.

A substantial number of poems, short stories, journalistic pieces and quasi-autobiographical “sketches” dominated the magazine at its onset (Richard Wright and Jack Conroy being prime examples) because the magazine stressed the presence of worker-correspondents in its pages “to make the ‘worker-writer’ a reality in the American radical press”. This movement lauded literature considered more appealing to a working-class audience. This convergence of literary philosophy and Communist Party policy in Depression-era America was facilitated by the John Reed Club of New York City, one of the Communist Party’s affiliated literary organizations. Thus, class conflict was to expand to the literary realm and support political revolution.

Later years and demise 

In the 1930s New Masses entered a new phase: a magazine of leftwing political comment, its attention to literature confined to book reviews and explosive editorials aimed at non-Marxist contemporaries. For example, in 1935, John L. Spivak published two articles, “Wall Street’s Fascist Conspiracy: Testimony that the Dickstein MacCormack Committee Suppressed” and “Wall Street's Fascist Conspiracy: Morgan Pulls the Strings”, with a deleted portion of a congressional committee. He said there was a plot that was part of a fascist conspiracy of financiers to take over the United States, and cited the names of business leaders. Furthermore, “[t]he proletariat Stalinists of the founding group,” according to Samuel Richard West, “began applying a Marxist litmus test to every contribution; as a result, the less ideological contributors and editors began to drop away”. The magazine still included literary and artistic content until its eventual demise, just not in the same abundance as in its previous years. While this content was slowly crowded out in favor of more journalistic pieces, New Masses still influenced the leftist cultural scene. For example, in 1937 New Masses printed Abel Meeropol’s anti-lynching poem “Strange Fruit,” later popularized in song by Billie Holiday. The magazine also sponsored the first From Spirituals to Swing concert on 23 December 1938 at Carnegie Hall and was organized by John Hammond.

Though the Great Depression caused resurgence in the American Communist movement and New Masses readership surged – so much so that Gold and his colleagues responded by turning the magazine into a weekly publication starting in January of 1934 – New Masses would eventually encounter competition from Partisan Review. One of its chief aims,  to provide a place for creative writing of a leftist character, was gradually crowded out of New Masses by its urgent demands for political and economic discussion and strict adherence to Party doctrine. Furthermore, according to Arthur C. Ferrari, New Masses illustrates how the circumstances under which political and cultural forces converge can be temporary. By the late 1930s, New Masses strongly backed the Communist Party USA’s Popular Front movement as a response to the rise of fascism and the Spanish Civil War. More specifically, though New Masses was an official organ of the Communist Party, it lost Party support when the Party entered the Popular Front stage – fighting the threat of fascism and global war trumped class conflict and political revolution for the foreseeable future .

Though the magazine supported these aims, the 1940s brought significant philosophical and practical troubles to the publication, as it faced the ideological upheaval created by the Molotov–Ribbentrop Pact (as well as blowback from its support for the Moscow Trials), while at the same time facing virulent anti-communism and censorship during the war. In 1948, editor Betty Millard published the influential article "Woman Against Myth", which examined and explained the history of the women's movement in the United States, in the socialist movement, and in the USSR. The New Masses ceased publication later that year.

In 1948, the magazine merged with another Communist quarterly to form Masses & Mainstream (1948–1963).

Managing editors
 
 Joseph Freeman :  His reputation rests on his influential introduction to Granville Hicks’s 1935 anthology, Proletarian Literature in the United States and his 1936 account of his immigrant coming-of-age and becoming a Communist, An American Testament. During the Depression years Freeman did his most influential work as a literary theorist and cultural journalist. His 1929 essay “Literary Theories,” a review essay for New Masses, and his 1938 Partisan Review article, “Mask Image Truth”, would eventually frame his mid-decade introduction to Hicks’s anthology. Freeman strains in these essays to honor the Communist Party line and, concurrently, to resist the ideological crudity, or “vulgar Marxism”, that often resulted from such striving.
 Mike Gold (1927–1930/1):  Real name Itzok Isaac Granich, the Jewish-American writer was a devout communist and abrasive left-wing literary critic. During the 1930s and 1940s, he was considered the proverbial dean of American proletarian literature. In 1925, after a trip to Moscow, he helped found New Masses, which published leftist works and set up radical theater groups. In 1928, he became the editor-in-chief. As editor, he adopted the hard-line stance to publish works by proletarian authors rather than literary leftists. Endorsing what he called “proletarian literature,” Gold was influential in making this style of fiction popular during the depression years of the 1930s. His most influential work, Jews Without Money, a fictionalized autobiography about growing up in impoverished Manhattan, was published in 1930.
 Walt Carmon (1930/1–1932)
 Whittaker Chambers (1932): Chambers became a contributor in 1931 with four short stories that catapulted him to contributing editor later in 1931 and managing editor for the first half of 1932, when he received order to join the Soviet underground (see Ware Group and Alger Hiss).  His name persisted in the masthead for months thereafter, perhaps as cover.
 Joseph Freeman (1932–1933)
 Granville Hicks (1934-1936):  Influential Marxist literary critic during the 1930s. He established his intellectual reputation as an influential literary critic with the 1933 publication of The Great Tradition, an analysis of American literature from a Marxist perspective. He joined the Communist Party and became literary editor of New Masses in January 1934, the same issue New Masses became a weekly. Hicks is remembered for his well-publicized resignation from the CPUSA in 1939.
 Joseph Freeman (1936–1937)

Footnotes

Further reading

 Aaron, Daniel. Writers on the Left: Episodes in American Literary Communism. New York: Harcourt, 1961.
 
 Folsom, Michael. “The Education of Michael Gold.” Proletarian Writers of the Thirties. Ed. David Madden. Carbondale, IL: Southern Illinois University Press, 1968. 222-51.
 Freeman, Joseph. “Literary Theories.” New Masses 4.5 (1929): 13.
 Freeman, Joseph. Introduction. Hicks 9–28.
 Gold, Mike. “Go Left, Young Writers!” New Masses 4.1 (1929): 3–4.
 Gold, Michael. Jews Without Money. New York: Liveright, 1930.
 Hemingway, Andrew. Artists on the Left: American Artists and the Communist Movement, 1926–1956. New Haven, CT: Yale University Press, 2002.
 Hicks, Granville. “The Crisis in American Criticism.” New Masses 9.2 (1933): 4–5.
 Hicks, Granville, et al., eds. Proletarian Literature in the United States: An Anthology. New York: International, 1935.
 Murphy, James F. “The American Communist Party Press and the New Masses.” The Proletarian Moment: The Controversy over Leftism in Literature. Chicago: University of Illinois Press, 1991. 55–82.
 Peck, David Russell. The Development of an American Marxist Literary Criticism: The Monthly "New Masses." PhD dissertation. Temple University, 1968.
 North, Joseph, ed. New Masses: An Anthology of the Rebel Thirties. New York: International, 1969.
 Wald, Alan M. Exiles from a Future Time: The Forging of a Mid-Twentieth Century Literary Left. Chapel Hill, NC: University of North Carolina Press, 2002.

External links
 Marxists.org: Marxists Internet Archive highest resolution scans online. Complete 1926 thru 1945. (high-resolution archive)*
 Montclair State University: selected articles
 Archives of American Art
 Crockett Johnson

Communist periodicals published in the United States
Communist magazines
Defunct political magazines published in the United States
Magazines established in 1926
Magazines disestablished in 1948
Marxist magazines
Magazines published in New York City
Communist Party USA publications